The 2005 Women's Indoor Pan American Cup was the 3rd edition of the Indoor Pan American Cup, an indoor hockey competition. The tournament was held in Kitchener, Canada, from 9–11 December.

Canada won the tournament for the first time, defeating the United States 2–1 in the final. Trinidad and Tobago won the bronze medal after defeating Venezuela 8–0 in the third place match.

Teams
The following eight teams competed for the title:

Results

Preliminary round

Fixtures

Classification round

Semi-finals

Third and fourth place

Final

Statistics

Final standings

Goalscorers

References

External links
Pan American Hockey Federation

Women's Indoor Pan American Cup
Indoor Pan American Cup
Indoor Pan American Cup
Indoor Pan American Cup
International women's field hockey competitions hosted by Canada
Sport in Kitchener, Ontario
Pan American Cup